Ganciclovir, sold under the brand name Cytovene among others, is an antiviral medication used to treat cytomegalovirus (CMV) infections.

Ganciclovir was patented in 1980 and approved for medical use in 1988.

Medical use
Ganciclovir is indicated for:
 Sight-threatening CMV retinitis in severely immunocompromised people
 CMV pneumonitis in bone marrow transplant recipients
 Prevention of CMV disease in bone marrow and solid organ transplant recipients
 Confirmed CMV retinitis in people with AIDS (intravitreal implant)

It is also used for acute CMV colitis in HIV/AIDS and CMV pneumonitis in immunosuppressed patients.

Ganciclovir has also been used with some success in treating Human herpesvirus 6 infections.

Ganciclovir has also been found to be an effective treatment for herpes simplex virus epithelial keratitis.

Adverse effects
Ganciclovir is commonly associated with a range of serious haematological adverse effects. Common adverse drug reactions (≥1% of patients) include: granulocytopenia, neutropenia, anaemia, thrombocytopenia, fever, nausea, vomiting, dyspepsia, diarrhea, abdominal pain, flatulence, anorexia, raised liver enzymes, headache, confusion, hallucination, seizures, pain and phlebitis at injection site (due to high pH), sweating, rash, itch, increased serum creatinine and blood urea concentrations.

Toxicity

Ganciclovir is considered a potential human carcinogen, teratogen, and mutagen. It is also considered likely to cause inhibition of spermatogenesis. Thus, it is used judiciously and handled as a cytotoxic drug in the clinical setting.

Mechanism of action

Ganciclovir is a synthetic analogue of 2′-deoxy-guanosine. It is first phosphorylated to ganciclovir monophosphate by a viral kinase encoded by the cytomegalovirus (CMV) gene UL97 during infection. Subsequently, cellular kinases catalyze the formation of ganciclovir diphosphate and ganciclovir triphosphate, which is present in 10-fold greater concentrations in CMV or herpes simplex virus (HSV)-infected cells than uninfected cells.

Ganciclovir triphosphate is a competitive inhibitor of deoxyguanosine triphosphate (dGTP) incorporation into DNA and preferentially inhibits viral DNA polymerases more than cellular DNA polymerases. In addition, ganciclovir triphosphate serves as a poor substrate for chain elongation, thereby disrupting viral DNA synthesis by a second route.

Pharmacokinetics

Absorption of the oral form is very limited—about 5% fasting, about 8% with food. It achieves a concentration in the central nervous system of about 50% of the plasma level. About 90% of plasma ganciclovir is eliminated unchanged in the urine, with a half-life of 2–6 hours, depending on renal function (elimination takes over 24 hours in end-stage renal disease).

Administration
Acute infections are treated in two phases:
 induction phase, 5 mg per kilogram intravenously every 12 hours for 14–21 days, the intravenous dose given as a 1-hour infusion
 maintenance phase, 5 mg per kg intravenously every day
Stable disease is treated with 1000 mg orally three times daily.  Similar dosing is used to prevent disease in high-risk patients, such as those infected with human immunodeficiency virus (HIV) or those with organ transplants.

Ganciclovir is also available in slow-release formulations for insertion into the vitreous humour of the eye, as treatment for CMV retinitis (associated with HIV infection).

A topical ophthalmic gel preparation of ganciclovir was recently approved for the treatment of acute herpes simplex keratitis.

See also 
Valganciclovir, the prodrug of ganciclovir

References

Further reading

External links 
 
 

Anti-herpes virus drugs
Cell culture reagents
Purines
Ethers
Diols
Hoffmann-La Roche brands